John Cusack (born 1966) is an American actor, producer, and screenwriter.

John Cusack can also refer to:
John F. Cusack (born 1937), American politician from Massachusetts
John Cusack (Australian politician) (1868–1956), Australian politician
John Cusack (hurler) (1925–2002), Irish hurler, active in the 1940s and 1950s
John Bede Cusack, pseudonym John Beede, author, younger brother of Dymphna Cusack
Johnny Cusack (1927–2020), Irish Gaelic footballer